Enio is a given name. It may refer to:

 Enio Conti (1913-2005), American football player
 Enio Sclisizzi (1925-2012), Canadian ice hockey player
 Enio Iommi (1926-2013), Argentine visual artist
 Ênio Andrade (1928-1997), Brazilian football manager and former midfielder
 Enio Mora (1949-1996), Italian gangster
 Enio Oliveira Junior (born 1981), known as Eninho, Brazilian football attacking midfielder
 Ênio (footballer, born 1985), Ênio Santos de Oliveira, Brazilian football centre-back
 Enio Novoa (born 1986), Peruvian football midfielder
 Enio Zilić (born 2000), Bosnian football centre-back
 Ênio (footballer, born 2001), Sebastião Enio Santos de Almeida, Brazilian football attacking midfielder